Love Story is a 1986 Indian Malayalam-language film, directed by Sajan and produced by M. Mani. The film stars Rohini, Shafeeq, Thilakan and Nedumudi Venu. The film has musical score by Shyam.

Plot

Love Story is a love story between a rich boy and a poor girl.

Cast
Rohini as Shobha
Bhagyalakshmi
Shafeeq as Raju
Nedumudi Venu as Kumaran Nair, Radhakrishnan (double role)
Lalu Alex as Satheeshan
Sabitha Anand as Savithri
Adoor Bhavani as Janakiyamma
Mala Aravindan as Krishnankutty
V. D. Rajappan as Blade Shishumadan
Innocent as Durgadas
Lalithasree as Typing tutor
KPAC Azeez as Vikraman
Sukumari as Rukmini
Sankaradi as Sreedharan
Poojappura Ravi as H. C. Balan Pilla
Jagannatha Varma as Menon
Tony as Ajayan, college student
Jagadish as Hameed
Kollam Ajith as Gunda
Thilakan

Soundtrack
The music was composed by Shyam and the lyrics were written by Chunakkara Ramankutty.

References

External links
 

1986 films
1980s Malayalam-language films
Films directed by Sajan